Nikita Khokhlov may refer to:
 Nikita Khokhlov (footballer, born 1983), Kazakhstani football player
 Nikita Khokhlov (footballer, born 1996), Russian football player